Wallis Currie-Wood (born December 12, 1991) is an American actress. She played Stephanie "Stevie" McCord in the CBS drama Madam Secretary.

Early years 
Wallis Currie-Wood was born December 12, 1991 in Austin, Texas.

Career
Before attending Juilliard School, Currie-Wood had experience acting in Austin, Texas, where she also studied violin at University of Texas String project and at Austin Chamber Music Academy. While at Juilliard, she was a stage performer in productions such as Twelfth Night, The Cherry Orchard, and Buried Child. Following Juilliard, Currie-Wood had a role in the Anne Hathaway–Robert De Niro comedy The Intern, which was released in 2015. She played Stephanie "Stevie" McCord, the eldest daughter of Secretary of State Elizabeth McCord and Dr. Henry McCord, on Madam Secretary. The six-season CBS series aired from 2014-2019.

References

External links
 

1991 births
21st-century American actresses
American film actresses
American television actresses
Juilliard School alumni
Living people